The 2000 Grand National (known as the Martell Grand National for sponsorship reasons) was the 153rd official renewal of the Grand National steeplechase that took place at Aintree Racecourse in England on 8 April 2000. 

The race was won in a time of 9 minutes 9.7 seconds and by a distance of  lengths by 10/1 shot Papillon, ridden by jockey Ruby Walsh. The winner was trained by his father Ted Walsh and ran in American Betty Moran's colours of green with ice blue piping. The field was limited to a maximum of 40 competitors of which 17 completed the course without mishap. None of the horses who failed to complete the course were injured.

Racecard

Leading contenders
Dark Stranger was sent off as the 9/1 favourite, largely due to his being the mount of champion jockey Tony McCoy. The pairing had won the Mildmay of Flete Handicap Chase at the recent Cheltenham meeting but had yet to win a race over three miles. The favourite backers' hopes were dashed early in the race when McCoy took a heavy fall at the third fence.

Star Traveller was a regular winner of good three mile chases prior to finishing third in a three-mile chase at the Cheltenham festival. The mount of Richard Johnson was sent off at 10/1 and led for much of the race before being pulled up after going lame when hitting the 25th fence.

Papillon was the subject of a huge public gamble from 33/1 to 10/1 on the day of the race. The Irish trained runner had undergone an unusual preparation of hurdles but had previously been second in the Irish Grand National and Irish Hennessey Cognac Gold Cup. Ruby Walsh kept his mount in the leading group throughout before taking the lead four fences from home, going on to win by  lengths.

Bobbyjo was popular with the public having won the previous year's National and was sent off at 12/1. He was again partnered by Paul Carberry and featured prominently in the early stages of the race until making a bad mistake at the seventh fence. The pair were always struggling to stay in touch after that and finished 11th.

Earthmover was a top hunter chaser who had run steadily in three-mile chases, including the Welsh National where he finished third, leading many to view him as an ideal Aintree type. He was sent off at 14/1 and ridden by Joe Tizzard but the pair parted company at the fourth fence.

Micko's Dream was considered the form horse going into the race after winning two three-mile chases in January and February but was sent off at 14/1 due to concerns that the ground was not soft enough for him. His partnership with Jason Titley ended in a first-fence fall.

The Last Fling was also sent off at 14/1 after a string of encouraging performances over three miles during the season, although he was largely outpaced in the recent Cheltenham Gold Cup. Ridden by Seamus Durack, The Last Fling was always working hard to stay on the tail of the leading half-dozen before finishing seventh.

Young Kenny was regarded as a perfect Grand National horse after winning the Midlands Grand National, Scottish Grand National and Singer & Friedlander Grand National trial but was also faced with the task of trying to be the first horse to carry the 12 stone top weight to victory for over 20 years. He started at 14/1 with Brendan Powell in the saddle but the pair came to grief at the tenth fence.

The retirement of both Richard Dunwoody and Graham Bradley after the 1999 running left two-time former winner Carl Llewellyn as the most senior rider in the weighing room, weighing out for a National for the tenth time. Eventual winner Ruby Walsh was among five riders making their debut in the race with all the other debut riders acquitting themselves well. Future winner Barry Geraghty finished fifth with Ollie McPhail and Bruce Gibson also completing the course, while Jimmy McCarthy fell at the final fence.

Finishing order

Non-finishers

Media coverage
The BBC retained the rights to broadcast the race live for 41st consecutive year and it was shown as a Grandstand Grand National special. Sue Barker made her debut as the anchor presenter, making her the fifth person and first woman to host the BBC broadcast. Barker presented the programme from the unsaddling enclosure, which was situated outside where the weighing room bar is today, with interviews with celebrity racegoers, connections of the competitors, former Aintree heroes and the winning connections after the race.

The rest of the BBC team comprised Clare Balding as a roving reporter on the course and in the saddling boxes. Balding had also been the anchor presenter on BBC's coverage of the previous two days of the Aintree meeting. Angus Loughran brought betting news and Richard Dunwoody interviewed the riders in the weighing room. The racing commentary team for the third consecutive year was John Hanmer, Tony O'Hehir and lead commentator Jim McGrath who, for the third year, called the winner home.

A post-race re-run, using slow motion and additional camera angles, including inside fences was presented by Richard Pitman.

The BBC television pictures were also syndicated globally for international broadcast while independent television cameras were also on course to provide pictures and commentary for SIS, broadcast into UK bookmakers' outlets.

BBC Radio also presented a live race commentary for the 59th time since its first broadcast in 1927.

All of the major national daily newspapers in the UK published pullout sections of their Saturday morning editions ranging from four to sixteen pages with most including full colour guides of the competitors.

References

 2000
Grand National
Grand National
Grand
April 2000 sports events in the United Kingdom